Karlsdotter is a Swedish patronymic name.  People known by this name include the following:

Anna Karlsdotter (died 1552), Swedish noble
Catherine Karlsdotter, (died 1450), Swedish queen
Magdalena Karlsdotter, known as Magdalena of Sweden (1445 – 1495), Swedish princess
Brita-Kajsa Karlsdotter (1816–1915), Swedish textile artist

See also

Carlsdotter
Karlsdóttir

Norwegian-language surnames
Swedish-language surnames